Trichanthodium is a genus of Australian plants in the tribe Gnaphalieae within the family Asteraceae.

 Species
 Trichanthodium baracchianum (Ewart & Jean White) P.S.Short - Victoria
 Trichanthodium exilis (W.Fitzg.) P.S.Short - Western Australia
 Trichanthodium scarlettianum P.S.Short - Western Australia
 Trichanthodium skirrophorum Sond. & F.Muell. - Western Australia, South Australia, Northern Territory, Queensland, New South Wales, Victoria

References

Gnaphalieae
Endemic flora of Australia
Asteraceae genera
Taxa named by Otto Wilhelm Sonder
Taxa named by Ferdinand von Mueller